Can You See Me Now? (CYSMN) is an urban chase game developed by Blast Theory and The Mixed Reality Lab in 2001. CYSMN is a pervasive game, where performers on the streets of a city use handheld computers, GPS and walkie talkies to chase online players who move their avatars through a virtual model of the same town. CYSMN was built in the Equator project on the EQUIP architecture.

It won the Golden Nica for Interactive Art at the Ars Electronica, Linz, Austria in 2003.

See also
 Location-based game
 Locative media
 Mobile media
 Pervasive game

References

Further reading 
 Steve Benford, Andy Crabtree, Martin Flintham, Adam Drozd, Rob Anastasi, Mark Paxton, Nick Tandavanitj, Matt Adams, Ju Row-Farr (2006): Can you see me now?. ACM Transactions on Computer-Human Interaction (TOCHI), Volume 13, Issue 1 (March 2006), MIT Press. Pages: 100 - 133.
 Thomas Dreher (2007):  Interaktive Stadterfahrung mit digitalen Medien (Internet, Mobiltelefon und Locative Media)
 Ars Electronica: Can You See Me Now?: Golden Nica / Interactive Art.

External links 
Can You See Me Now?

Mixed reality games
Location-based games